Samsunspor is a Turkish professional football club located in the city of Samsun. The club was formed through a merger of five clubs: 19 Mayıs, Akınspor, Fener Gençlik, Samsunspor, and Samsunspor Galatasaray. The club colours are red and white, and they play their home matches at Samsun Stadium.

The club finished runners-up for the 2. Lig crown in 1968–69, but then yo-yoed between the top two divisions until 1993. The club competed in the UEFA Intertoto Cup in 1997 and 1998, and won the Balkans Cup in 1994.

History

First Years
Samsunspor stepped into professional leagues for the first time in the second football league, today's TFF First League in the 1965–66 season. The opponent of Samsunspor, who played the first professional league match on September 5, 1965, was Yeşildirek S.K. Samsunspor won the match 1–0 with the goal scored by Nihat Serçeme. Thus Nihat made history as the player who scored Samsunspor's first league goal. In this first season of the league, Samsunspor became 5th in the White Group. The club also competed in the Turkish Cup that year. They reached round two after defeating Güneşspor in the first round, but would go on to lose 2–1 to Petrolspor. The following season was more successful, as the club placed second in the 2. Lig, six points behind champion Bursaspor. In the Turkish Cup, the club reached the semi-finals, defeating Konyaspor, Adanaspor, Manisaspor, Galatasaray, and Fenerbahçe along the way. They met Göztepe in the semi-finals, eventually losing 5–2 on aggregate. Samsunspor finished second in the 2. Lig and were knocked out in the first round of the Turkish Cup in 1967–68.

The club earned their first promotion to the 1. Lig (Süper Lig) in 1969. They finished first in the Beyaz Grup (White Group) of the 2. Lig, six points ahead of runners-up Boluspor. Because there were two groups, the winners of each group played each other in a final game to decide the champion and the runner-up. Ankaragücü beat Samsunspor 1–0 in the final. Samsunspor finished fifth in their first season in the 1. Lig, five points away from securing a spot in the Balkans Cup. The club finished with a record  of eleven wins, nine draws, and ten losses, while scoring 24 goals and allowing 28. Samsunspor finished tenth the following season and were knocked out of the first round of the Turkish Cup for the second year in a row.
After competing in first tier for five seasons, Samsunspor completed the league in the 15th place with 24 points in the 1974–75 season and relegated to the 2nd Football League. Upon this, coach Basri Dirimlili was dismissed and Kamuran Soykıray was brought back to the team. 
1975-76 Football League season Soykıray again made the club White Group leader and Samsunspor has moved to the First Football League. In the same season, Samsunspor won Ministry of Youth and Sports Cup after Bursaspor II was defeated 2–1.

Golden Ages
In the Mid-1980s, Samsunspor has achieved some of its major successes in the first tier of Turkish Football. After the promotion from second tier in 1984–85, Samsunspor finished First League at 3rd place with 33 goals scored by Tanju Çolak in 1985–86 season. The next season, the club had one of the best season in its history. Ranking again 3rd in the league where Tanju Çolak scored 25 goals, the team rose to the semi-finals in the Federation Cup. The next season, Samsunspor finished the league in fourth place and reached the final in the Turkish Cup. Until the cup final, Nevşehirspor, Uşakspor, Kocaelispor and MKE Ankaragücü were eliminated but lost to Sakaryaspor as a result of the two-legged final.

Accident
On 20 January 1989, while traveling to Malatya to face Malatyaspor, Samsunspor were involved in a bus accident. The accident killed three players, two coaches, and seriously injured seven other team members. Among the players killed were Mete Adanır and Muzaffer Badalıoğlu; Zoran Tomić fell into a coma for six months before dying in his native Yugoslavia. Manager Nuri Asan and the bus driver were also killed. Of the players who were injured, two continued playing. Emin Kar, captain of Samsunspor, was left paralyzed after the event. Fatih Uraz, then starting goalkeeper of Samsunspor and the Turkey national football team, broke a vertebra in his back. He made a return to football, but was unable to regain a starting place at either national or club level.

Promotions and Relegations
Samsunspor took place in the first tier again in the 1993–94 season and it was in the league continuously for thirteen seasons. The club finished the league at 5th position and run to semi-finals in Turkish Cup at their comeback season. In both 1994-95 and 1995–96 seasons Samsunspor finished the first League 8th place and run to semi-finals in Turkish Cup Again. 1996-97 Season finished in the 9th place in the first managerial season of Gheorghe Mulțescu but played  in the UEFA Intertoto Cup with a minor success. Samsunspor relegated from first tier, it's  now Super Lig in 2005–06 season after finishing the league at 17th place. Between 2006 and 2011, Samsunspor competed in second tier now TFF First League until succeed a promotion after being a runner-up behind the league champion Mersin İdman Yurdu. Unfortunately, Samsunspor relegated again after a season in the first tier. In the 2017–18 season, the club relegated to the third tier, TFF Second League for the first time in its history. 

On the way back from an away match in February 2012, two players were injured when the team coach was struck by a train on a level crossing.

Supporters 
Samsunspor's main ultra group who go by the name, Şirinler (Smurfs) are well known for their ‘flare march’. Hundreds and sometimes thousands of Şirinler meet up at Çiftlik Avenue and walk to the 19 Mayis stadium with flares, turning the city red and creating an intense atmosphere.

Honours 
TFF First League
Winners (6): 1968–69, 1975–76, 1981–82, 1984–85, 1990–91, 1992–93 
Runners-up (2): 1968–69, 2010–11
TFF Second League
Winners (1): 2019-20
Balkans Cup
Winners (1): 1993–94

Seasons 
 Süper Lig (30 seasons): 1969–1975, 1976–1979, 1982–1983, 1985–1990, 1991–1992, 1993–2006, 2011-2012
 TFF First League (23 seasons): 1965–1969, 1975–1976, 1979–1982, 1983–1985, 1990–1991, 1992–1993, 2006–2011, 2012–2018, 2020-
 TFF Second League (2 seasons): 2018-2020

European Competitions
Samsunspor competed in European competition for the first time in 1993. The club took part in the last edition of the Balkans Cup, defeating PFC Pirin Blagoevgrad before facing PAS Giannina in the final. The first leg took place in Greece, which Samsunspor won 3–0. The second leg took place in Turkey, where Samsunspor sealed the championship with a 2–0 win. The club competed in the 1997 UEFA Intertoto Cup after finishing in ninth place. They were drawn into Group 6 alongside Hamburger SV, FBK Kaunas, Leiftur Ólafsfjörður, Odense Boldklub. Samsunspor finished second with nine points and were unable to advance. The club qualified for the Intertoto Cup again the following season. Drawn against Danish club Lyngby Boldklub, Samsunspor took a 3–0 lead in the first leg. The club faced a scare in the second leg, advancing by one goal on aggregate after losing the match 1–3. They faced English club Crystal Palace F.C. in the second round, beating the club four to nil on aggregate. Samsunspor were knocked out of the cup in the semi-finals after losing 6–0 at the hands of Werder Bremen.

UEFA Intertoto Cup:

Balkans Cup:

Players

Current squad

Other players under contract

Out on loan

Managerial history

 Kamuran Soykıray (Oct 1968 – May 1969)
 Basri Dirimlili (Jul 1969 – Feb 1970)
 Lefter Küçükandonyadis (Feb 1970 – Jul 1970)
 Turgay Şeren (Jul 1970 – Mar 1971)
 Abdullah Matay (Jul 1972 – Apr 1973)
 Nuri Asan (Apr 1973 – Nov 1973)
 Gazanfer Olcayto (Dec 1973 – Feb 1975)
 Basri Dirimlili (Feb 1975 – May 1975)
 Kamuran Soykıray (Jun 1975 – Jun 1977)
 Abdullah Gegic (Nov 1978 – Feb 1979)
 Nuri Asan (Feb 1979 – Jun 1979)
 Fevzi Zemzem (Sep 1981 – Jun 1982)
 Mehmet Babalık (Aor 1982 – Jun 1982)
 Arda Vural (Jul 1982 – Sep 1982)
 Adnan Dinçer (Oct 1982 – Jun 1982)
 Nuri Asan (Apr 1983 – Jun 1983)
 Fahrettin Genç (Jul 1983 – Jul 1984)
 Fethi Demircan (Jul 1984 – Jun 1986)
 Milorad Mitrovic (Jul 1986 – Oct 1987)
 Şükrü Goran (Oct 1987 – Dec 1988)
 Nuri Asan (Dec 1988 – Jan 1989)
 Yılmaz Vural (Aug 1989 – Sep 1989)
 Milorad Mitrovic (Oct 1989 – Jan 1990)
 Yılmaz Gökdel (Feb 1990 – Jun 1990)
 Özkan Sümer (Oct 1991 – Mar 1992)
 Zeynel Soyuer (Jul 1992 – Jun 1993)
 Gheorghe Mulțescu (Jul 1993 – Jan 1997)
 Horst Hrubesch (Jul 1997 – Sep 1997)
 Jozef Jarabinsky (Sep 1997 – Apr 1998)
 Metin Türel (Sep 1998 – Jun 1999)
 Erdoğan Arıca (Jul 1999 – Jun 2000)
 Bülent Ünder (July 2000 – April 2001)
 Đorđe Jovanovski (March 2002 – Dec 2002)
 Sakip Özberk (Dec 2002 – June 2003)
 Gheorghe Mulțescu (July 2003 – Sept 2003)
 Ertuğrul Sağlam (July 2003 – June 2005)
 Erdoğan Arıca (Sept 2003 – June 2004)
 Şaban Yıldırım (July 2005 – Sept 2005)
 Erdoğan Arıca (Oct 2005 – April 2006)
 Levent Eriş (Sept 2006 – March 2007)
 Mustafa Uğur (March 2007– August 2007)
 Yücel İldiz (Aug 2007 – Jan 2008)
 Muhammet Dilaver (interim) (Jan 2008 – Feb 2008)
 Orhan Kapucu (Feb 2008 – June 2008)
 Hayrettin Gümüşdağ (Aug 2008 – Nov 2008)
 Nafiz Tural (interim) (Nov 2008)
 Hülagü Ercüment Coşkundere (Nov 2008 – June 2009)
 Turhan Özyazanlar (July 2009 – Oct 2009)
 Orhan Anıl (interim) (Oct 2009 – Nov 2009)
 Hüseyin Kalpar (Oct 2009 – June 2011)
 Vladimir Petković (July 2011 – Jan 2012)
 Mesut Bakkal (Jan 2012 – May 2012)
 Tarkan Demirhan (May 2012 – Aug 2012)
 Erhan Altın (Aug 2012 – Oct 2013)
 Ümit Özat (Aug 2015 – Jan 2016)
 Engin Korukır (Feb 2016 – Sep 2016)
 Osman Özköylü (Oct 2016 – May 2017)
 Alpay Özalan (Aug 2017 – Sep 2017)
 Engin İpekoğlu (Oct 2017 – Feb 2018)
 Besim Durmuş (Feb 2018 – Jun 2018)
 Taner Taşkın (Jul 2018 – Jan 2019)
 İsmet Taşdemir (Jan 2019 – Jun 2019)
 İrfan Buz (Jul 2019 – Oct 2019)
 Recep Sermet Boyar (interim) (Oct 2019)
 Ertuğrul Sağlam (Nov 2019– June 2021)
 Mehmet Altıparmak (June 2021– Oct 2021)
 Fuat Çapa (Oct 2021– May 2022)
 Bayram Bektaş (June 2022–cont)

References

External links 

Official website
Samsunspor on TFF.org

 
1965 establishments in Turkey
Association football clubs established in 1965
Football clubs in Turkey
Sport in Samsun
Süper Lig clubs